Mauricio Javier Rojas Toro (born 30 March 1978) is a Chilean former football midfielder, who also can played as a defender.

International career
He was a member of the bronze winning Chile national football team at the 2000 Summer Olympics in Sydney, Australia. He started his professional career at Santiago Wanderers in Valparaíso.

Rojas made an appearance for the Chile B national team in the friendly match against Catalonia in 28 December 2001.

Honours

Club
Santiago Wanderers
 Primera División de Chile (1): 2001

International
Chile
 Olympic Games Bronze Medal (1): 2000 Sydney

References

External links
 
 Mauricio Rojas at MemoriaWanderers 
 Mauricio Rojas at PlaymakerStats
 

1978 births
Living people
People from Quilpué
Chilean footballers
Chile international footballers
Olympic footballers of Chile
Footballers at the 2000 Summer Olympics
Olympic bronze medalists for Chile
Santiago Wanderers footballers
San Luis de Quillota footballers
Audax Italiano footballers
Cobresal footballers
Unión Española footballers
Unión Temuco footballers
Chilean Primera División players
Tercera División de Chile players
Primera B de Chile players
Olympic medalists in football
Medalists at the 2000 Summer Olympics
Association football midfielders
Chilean football managers